The Salvadoran women's football championship is the main women's football competition for in El Salvador. It was established in 2010.

History
There previously were some women's tournaments held in the late 1990s and early 2000s.

A New Salvadoran League

Preparation
In September 2019,  as part of the guidelines done by CONCACAF for clubs to be able to participate in the primera division, the formation of a womans division was needed. The new division was created by the Salvadoran Primera division, which will be run instead of FESFUT. The new season will begin in September 2019.

Format

Clubs
A total of 12 teams contest the league in the current season

Former teams 
 Independiente
 El Vencedor
 ADFA Cabañas
 ADFA Ahuachapán
 C.D. Opico
 ADFA Santa Ana
 ADFA Morazán
 ADFA Sonsonate
 Sensuntepeque
 ADFA La Paz 
 ADFA San Vicente
 AD Legend's
 Club Sport Guazapa
 Escuela de Fútbol Municipal de Soyapango
 Escuela Municipal de Santa Tecla
 Instituto Municipal de Deportes y Recreación (IMDER)
 Selección de San Miguel

Managers
The current managers in the LigaFemenina are:

List of finals
Finals played so far:

References

External links
FESFUT website, Salvadoran FA

Women's association football leagues in Central America
Women
Women's sports leagues in El Salvador